The Sony Xperia Z3 Tablet Compact is a waterproof & dustproof compact Android tablet manufactured and designed by Sony. It was unveiled during a press conference at IFA 2014 on September 3, 2014 along with the Xperia Z3 and Xperia Z3 Compact. It is the manufacture's first 8.0 inch (203.2 mm) tablet. The tablet was the winner of the Reddot Award 2015 for the product design.

The key feature of the tablet is the compact size 8.0 inch (203.2 mm) display with density of 283 ppi. It also carries an IP rating of IP65 and IP68.

Specifications

Hardware
The device is waterproof and dustproof with the IP rating of IP65 and IP68. The device features 8.0 inch (203.2 mm) display with density of 283 ppi, featuring Sony's "Triluminos" technology. The device is powered by 2.5 GHz quad-core Qualcomm Snapdragon 801 system-on-chip with 3 GB of RAM. The tablet's rear-facing camera is 8 megapixels with a Sony Exmor RS image sensor and can record 1080p video.

Software
The Xperia Z3 Tablet Compact  comes pre-loaded with Android 4.4.4 "KitKat" with Sony's custom interface and software. Along with the Xperia Z3, the new additions to the software include the Lifelog app, Sony Select, and support for Remote Play on the PlayStation 4 video game console.

Reception
In Engadget review, the tablet was given a score of 74 out of 100 and it was praised of its display and body built but criticized on its price and its camera.

References

External links
 White Paper (LTE)
 White Paper (WiFi)
 Press Release
 Official Website

Xperia Z3 Tablet Compact
Android (operating system) devices
Digital audio players
Tablet computers introduced in 2014